Poland  competed at the 2019 World Aquatics Championships in Gwangju, South Korea from 12 to 28 July.

Artistic swimming

Poland entered 9 artistic swimmers.

Women

 Legend: (R) = Reserve Athlete

Diving

Poland entered three divers.

Men

Women

High diving

Poland qualified one male high diver.

Open water swimming

Poland qualified one male and one female open water swimmers.

Men

Women

Swimming

Poland entered 22 swimmers.

Men

Women

Mixed

References

World Aquatics Championships
Nations at the 2019 World Aquatics Championships
2019